Flightfox is a website that offers consultative flight searching by allowing users to launch trips in which contracted experts consult with the customer to find the lowest airfares and construct the best itinerary. The customer pays a flat rate fee which provides access to a consultant.

History
Flightfox was founded in 2012 by Todd Sullivan and Lauren McLeod, in Eveleigh, New South Wales, Australia. They were frequent travellers and were seeking to make their travel funds go further. They raised $800,000 in seed funding from Silicon Valley and Australian investors to set up the venture. As part of the process Sullivan and McLeod moved to Mountain View to take part in a Y-Combinator class, that provides intensive mentoring for start-ups.

Sullivan and McLeod had previously created Globetrooper, which allowed travellers to meet up with other like-minded people to go travelling together. They sold Globetrooper in October 2011. McLeod commented that after creating Globetrooper they realised that they needed a business model from its inception and needed to listen more to its users on improving the site. Sullivan has an IT background and is the site's developer, while McLeod who has a business and design background, works on marketing and dealing with the sites users.

Flightfox previously featured a contest-style format in which multiple experts competed to find the best flights for the customer, however due to demand, a one-on-one consultative model was implemented in January 2014.

Features
The Flightfox concept followed on from web based travel booking pioneers Expedia and Travelocity. Flightfox sought to bring consistently best fares by having its approved researchers find them. People applying for the service submit an itinerary proposal and is assigned to a specialist consultant who finds the lowest fare, quickest journey or otherwise best suits the flyer's preferences.

Flightfox considered that human searchers can locate flights for more complex travel requests, such as those with unusual luggage or needs, more readily than software based systems, as well as applying airfare tricks that allow for a lower fare. Customers have reported savings of thousands of dollars, but according to Flightfox this varies between each request.

References

External links
 Official Twitter

Comparison shopping websites
American travel websites
Internet properties established in 2012